Mark Zuckerberg (b. 1984) is a co-founder of Facebook and Meta.

Zuckerberg may also refer to:

 Zuckerberg (surname)
 Chan Zuckerberg Initiative (or Zuckerberg Initiative) ie. Zuckerberg Foundation
 Zuckerberg San Francisco General Hospital and Trauma Center (Zuckerberg Hospital), San Francisco, California, USA
 Zuckerberg Institute for Water Research (Zuckerberg Institute), Israel
 Zuckerberg Island, an island in British Columbia, Canada

See also

 
 Zucker (disambiguation)
 Berg (disambiguation)